National Pictures is an Indian film production and distribution company started by Vellore P. A. Perumal Mudaliar. This company distributed more than 200 films. Shivaji Ganesan and M. R. Radha were introduced to Tamil cinema by this company.

Notable films
Parasakthi (film) (1952) - The first film starring Shivaji Ganesan.

Ratha Kanneer (1954) - The first film starring MR Radha.

Petra Manam (1960)

Thangathurai (1972)

Reference

Indian film studios
Film distributors of India
Film production companies of Tamil Nadu
Companies with year of establishment missing